Nicola Slater (born 14 August 1984) is a British former tennis player.

Slater has won six doubles titles on the ITF Circuit in her career. On 24 October 2011, she reached her best singles ranking of world No. 650. On 16 September 2013, she peaked at No. 167 in the doubles rankings.

Partnering CoCo Vandeweghe, Slater won her first $50,000 tournament at the 2013 Boyd Tinsley Women's Clay Court Classic, defeating Nicole Gibbs and Shelby Rogers in the final.

ITF Circuit finals

Doubles: 11 (6–5)

References

External links
 
 

1984 births
Living people
Sportspeople from Ayr
British female tennis players
Florida State Seminoles women's tennis players
Scottish female tennis players